Kouwo (also Kouô ) is a village and seat (chef-lieu) of the commune of Diédougou in the Cercle of Koutiala in the Sikasso Region of southern Mali. The village lies 67 km west of the town of Koutiala.

References

Populated places in Sikasso Region